Mark Mellors (1880–1961) was an English footballer who played for Notts County, Brighton, Sheffield United and Bradford City, with whom he played in the 1911 FA Cup Final.

He retired in 1915.

He later became a successful businessman in the wool trade, and died in 1961 at the age of 81.

References

External links
Player profile at BantamsPast.co.uk
T&A

1880 births
1961 deaths
English footballers
Notts County F.C. players
Brighton & Hove Albion F.C. players
Sheffield United F.C. players
Bradford City A.F.C. players
English Football League players
Association football goalkeepers
FA Cup Final players